Frank du Moulin (9 July 1870 – 9 July 1947) was a bishop coadjutor of the Diocese of Ohio in The Episcopal Church from 1914 to 1924, having previously served as priest and dean of Trinity Cathedral in Cleveland.

References

1870 births
1947 deaths
Episcopal bishops of Ohio